The Country Doctor is a 1927 silent film directed by Rupert Julian and starring Rudolph Schildkraut. It was produced by Cecil B. DeMille and distributed by Pathé Exchange.

Cast
Rudolph Schildkraut - Dr. Amos Rinker
Frank Coghlan Jr. - Sard Jones
Sam De Grasse - Ira Harding
Virginia Bradford - Opal Jones
Gladys Brockwell - Myra Jones
Frank J. Marion - Joe Harding
Jane Keckley - Abbie Harding
Louis Natheaux - Sidney Fall
Ethel Wales - Redora Bump
Carmencita Johnson - Baby (*uncredited)

Preservation status
Copies are held by several US and Euro archives.

References

External links

lobby poster(archived)
lobby poster(archived)

1927 films
American silent feature films
Films directed by Rupert Julian
American black-and-white films
Pathé Exchange films
1920s English-language films
1920s American films